Crucihimalaya is a genus of flowering plants belonging to the family Brassicaceae.

Its native range is Sinai to China.

Species:

Crucihimalaya axillaris 
Crucihimalaya bursifolia 
Crucihimalaya himalaica 
Crucihimalaya kneuckeri 
Crucihimalaya lasiocarpa 
Crucihimalaya mollissima 
Crucihimalaya ovczinnikovii 
Crucihimalaya rupicola 
Crucihimalaya stricta 
Crucihimalaya tenuisiliqua 
Crucihimalaya tibetica 
Crucihimalaya virgata 
Crucihimalaya wallichii

References

Brassicaceae
Brassicaceae genera